Borovica is a Serbo-Croatian toponym. It may refer to:
Borovica, Bosnia and Herzegovina
Borovica, Montenegro

See also
Borowica (disambiguation)

Serbo-Croatian place names